Acrisure Arena is a multi-purpose 10,000-seat indoor arena in the unincorporated community of Thousand Palms in Riverside County, California's, Coachella Valley Palm Springs Area. It is the home arena for the American Hockey League's Coachella Valley Firebirds. Acrisure, a financial technology company, paid an undisclosed sum for 10 years of naming rights.

History
On June 26, 2019, it was reported that the ownership of the upcoming Seattle Kraken had chosen Palm Springs as the site for Seattle's AHL affiliate and that the Agua Caliente Band of Cahuilla Indians and Oak View Group (OVG) had teamed up to build an arena on band-owned land as a home for their proposed expansion team. The 10,000-seat arena was estimated to cost $250 million. OVG CEO Tim Leiweke relied upon a feasibility study on the future of sports events and tourism in the Coachella Valley, independently authored by Coachella Sports & Entertainment Stadium Authority and the non-profit SoCal Coyotes Sports Leadership Organization, as proof of the viability for a multi-purpose venue in Palm Springs.

The proposed arena was to be constructed on part of the Spa Resort Casino's parking lots and be owned by the Agua Caliente Band of Cahuilla Indians with the Oak View Group as the arena operator. It would also have had an adjoining facility to serve as a year-round community gathering space as well as the training center for the AHL team. Groundbreaking and construction on the arena was expected to begin in February 2020, with completion by fall 2021, but was put on hold due to the COVID-19 pandemic and the resulting ban on large gatherings including concerts and sporting events. By September 2020, OVG's negotiations with the tribe had come to a halt and the agreement was ended.

On September 16, 2020, the Oak View Group and H.N. and Frances C. Berger Foundation announced they had chosen a new location for the arena in the middle of the Coachella Valley near Palm Desert, but it would not open until at least 2022. The arena operator will lease land owned by the Foundation between Interstate 10 and the Foundation's Classic Club golf course. Groundbreaking on the project took place on June 2, 2021.

Events

Concerts
A list of concerts at the arena.

References

External links
 Official Site

Indoor ice hockey venues in California
Sports venues in Riverside County, California
Thousand Palms, California
Palm Desert, California
Coachella Valley